Nicotinonitrile or 3-cyanopyridine is an organic compound with the formula NCC5H4N.  The molecule consists of a pyridine ring with a nitrile group attached to the 3-position.  A colorless solid, it is produced by ammoxidation of 3-methylpyridine:
H3CC5H4N  +  NH3  +  1.5 O2   →   NCC5H4N  +  3 H2O

Nicotinonitrile is a precursor to the vitamin niacin.

Nitrilase-catalyzed hydrolysis of 3-cyanopyridine by means of immobilized Rhodococcus rhodochrous J1 strains leads in quantitative yield to nicotinamide (vitamin B3). The enzyme allows for a more selective synthesis as further hydrolysis of the amide to nicotinic acid is avoided.

Oxidation of 3-cyanopyridine with hydrogen peroxide gives 3-cyanopyridine N-oxide, which hydrolyzes to nicotinic acid N-oxide, a precursor to pharmaceuticals.

References

3-Pyridyl compounds
Aromatic nitriles